Alexandru Melenciuc (born 20 March 1979) is a Moldovan professional football player. He currently plays for Navbahor Namangan in Uzbek League.

Career
He started playing career at Sheriff Tiraspol in 1999. In August 2011 Melenciuc moved to Sogdiana Jizzakh. On 14 April 2012 he signed short-term contract with FC Tighina. After playing for Tighina, he moved to FC Speranța Crihana Veche.

In February 2013 he moved to Sogdiana Jizzakh to play in 2013 Uzbek League season. After playing 2 seasons for Sogdiana in 51 matches, he joined in 2015 Navbahor Namangan.

Honours

Club
Sheriff Tiraspol
 Divizia Naţională (3): 2007–08, 2008–09, 2009–10
 Moldovan Cup (3): 2008, 2009, 2010 
 Moldovan Super Cup (1): 2007

References

External links
 
 

1979 births
Living people
Moldovan footballers
Moldova international footballers
Association football goalkeepers
People from Bender, Moldova
Uzbekistan Super League players
FC Tiraspol players
FC Sheriff Tiraspol players
FC Sogdiana Jizzakh players
FC Speranța Crihana Veche players